Rabri Devi Yadav (born 1 January 1955) is an Indian politician who formerly served as the Leader of the Opposition in Bihar Vidhan Parishad. She formerly served 3 terms as the Chief Minister of Bihar, the first and only woman till date to have held the office. She is a Member (MLC) of Bihar Legislative Council. 

Rabri is married to Indian politician Lalu Prasad Yadav, former Chief Minister of Bihar (1990-1997) and former Railway Minister of India (2004-2009) and mother of Tejashwi Yadav, current Deputy Chief Minister of Bihar and former Leader of the Opposition in Bihar Legislative Assembly.

Early life
Rabri Devi was born on 1 January 1955 in Salar Kalan village near Mirganj of Gopalganj district, Bihar. Her parents are Shiv Prasad Chaudhary and Maharjia Devi. She is named after an Indian sweet as per a custom in her family. Her 3 sisters are similarly named Jalebi, Rasgulla and Paan. 

Prabhunath Yadav, Subhash Prasad Yadav and Sadhu Yadav are her three real brothers.

Political career
Rabri Devi became the first female Chief Minister of Bihar on 25 July 1997, after her husband, Lalu Prasad Yadav, was forced to resign following the arrest warrant issued against him in corruption charges relating to the Fodder scam. She went on to rule the state till 2005.

Devi was elected thrice to Bihar Vidhan Sabha from Raghopur seat. In 2010 Bihar Legislative Assembly election, Rabri Devi contested from two seats: Raghopur and Sonpur assembly seats, but lost both in an election where the Rashtriya Janata Dal faced defeat, winning only 22 seats.

She contested from Saran in 2014 Lok Sabha election but lost to Rajiv Pratap Rudy of BJP.

Criticism
Devi's appointment as the Chief Minister of Bihar is considered one of the most unexpected and awkward decisions in Indian political history, as she was a traditional housewife and had no interest nor any prior experience in politics. She came under severe satirical criticism and stiff opposition, because of her illiteracy and inexperience.

Personal life & Family

Rabri Devi married Lalu Prasad Yadav on 1 June 1973 at the age of 17 years, in an arranged marriage, and they went on to have 2 sons and 7 daughters.  Her younger son Tejashwi Yadav is the current and 5th Deputy Chief Minister of Bihar.

 elder son: Tej Pratap Yadav 
 younger son: Tejashwi Yadav 
 eldest daughter: Misa Bharti 
 2nd daughter: Rohini Acharya Yadav
 3rd daughter: Chanda Yadav 
 4th daughter: Ragini Yadav - married to Rahul Yadav, Samajwadi Party leader
 5th daughter: Hema Yadav
 6th daughter: Anushka Yadav (Dhannu) - married to Chiranjeev Rao
 youngest daughter: Raj Lakshmi Yadav - married to Tej Pratap Singh Yadav

Note: Rahul Yadav is son of Jitendra Yadav, former MLC from the Samajwadi Party. Jitendra is the nephew of former MP D. P. Yadav.

Positions held 
Rabri Devi Yadav has been elected 3 times as MLA.

References

External links

Living people
Chief Ministers of Bihar
Rashtriya Janata Dal politicians
Finance Ministers of Bihar
Women chief ministers of Indian states
United Progressive Alliance candidates in the 2014 Indian general election
Leaders of the Opposition in the Bihar Legislative Assembly
Women members of the Bihar Legislative Assembly
Yadav family of Bihar
20th-century Indian women politicians
20th-century Indian politicians
21st-century Indian women politicians
21st-century Indian politicians
Members of the Bihar Legislative Council
Members of the Bihar Legislative Assembly
1956 births